South Darley is a civil parish in the Derbyshire Dales district of Derbyshire, England.  The parish contains nine listed buildings that are recorded in the National Heritage List for England.  Of these, one is listed at Grade I, the highest of the three grades, and the others are at Grade II, the lowest grade. The parish contains the villages of Darley Bridge, Snitterton and Wensley, and the surrounding countryside.  The listed buildings consist of houses and associated structures, a public house, a church, a milestone and a telephone kiosk. 


Key

Buildings

References

Citations

Sources

 

Lists of listed buildings in Derbyshire